Kuleh Jaz (also Romanized as Kūleh Jāz; also known as Kooljaz, Kūleh Jār, and Kūlī Jāz) is a village in Sardarabad Rural District, in the Central District of Shushtar County, Khuzestan Province, Iran. At the 2006 census, its population was 1,121, in 200 families.

References 

Populated places in Shushtar County